Isuzu Motors Saudi Arabia Company Limited is a commercial vehicle manufacturer and dealer based in Dammam, Saudi Arabia. It is a joint venture between Isuzu (99%) and Isuzu Motors Asia (1%).

History
The first concrete plans for this project can be traced back to 2007, but a corresponding declaration of intent and the establishment of the company were delayed until 2011 due to the Great Recession. At the end of 2012, the plant was opened in the presence of the Saudi Arabian Minister of Economics. It is the first complete production plant for Japanese trucks in the Gulf region.

The company has more than 100 employees. The theoretical capacity is 3000 units. Despite a planned capacity expansion to 25,000 copies at the time of opening, around 2000 and 1700 vehicles were produced in 2016 and 2017 respectively.

Models
The F series is produced by Isuzu Motors Saudi Arabia.

References

External links
Official website

Isuzu
Vehicle manufacturing companies established in 2011
Truck manufacturers of Saudi Arabia
2011 establishments in Saudi Arabia
Companies based in Dammam